Amy Parmenter (born 1 August 1997) is an Australian netball player in the Suncorp Super Netball league, playing for Giants Netball.

Parmenter was elevated to the Giants senior ahead of the 2019 season, having been a training partner with Canberra Giants in the Australian Netball League for the previous two years. Before her time in the ANL, Parmenter represented Netball New South Wales and Australia at under 17/19 levels. Parmenter had an outstanding debut season at the Giants, recording the most intercepts of any midcourter in the competition and ending the year by being awarded the Rising Star award.

References

External links
 Giants Netball profile
 Suncorp Super Netball profile
 Amy Parmenter Interview – YouTube

1997 births
Australian netball players
Giants Netball players
Living people
Suncorp Super Netball players
Australian Netball League players
Netball players from New South Wales
Canberra Giants (ANL) players
New South Wales Institute of Sport netball players
New South Wales state netball league players